Kim Byung-chul (born 5 July 1974) is a South Korean actor. He is best known for playing Cha Min-hyuk in the television series Sky Castle. He has risen to fame by acting in hit television dramas such as Descendants of the Sun, Guardian: The Lonely and Great God and All of Us Are Dead.

Filmography

Film

Television series

Awards and nominations

References

External links
 

 

1974 births
Living people
South Korean male film actors
South Korean male television actors
South Korean male stage actors
Chung-Ang University alumni